The Martinique national rugby union team represents Martinique at the sport of rugby. Martinique has been playing international rugby since 1991 but has never qualified for a Rugby World Cup. 

They have played mainly against Caribbean sides, i.e. Trinidad & Tobago, Guyana and Barbados.



Record

Overall

See also
 French Rugby Federation
 Comité Territorial de Rugby de la Martinique
 Rugby union in Martinique

References

External links
 Comité Territorial de Rugby de la Martinique on facebook.com

Rugby union in Martinique
Sports teams in Martinique
Caribbean national rugby union teams
R